CpG can be:
CpG site - methylated sequences of DNA significant in gene regulation
CpG Oligodeoxynucleotide - unmethylated sequences of DNA that have immunostimulatory properties
CpG island - regions of DNA that contain several CpG sites